A refractory is a heat-resistant material, such as:

 Refractory ceramic, a ceramic that is resistant to heat
 Refractory metals, metals that are resistant to heat and wear
 Refraction (metallurgy), the resistance of metals to heat

Refractory may also refer to:

 Refractory (astronomy), any material, which condenses at high temperature
 Refractory clergymen: Roman Catholic priests and bishops in France who refused to swear an oath of allegiance to the state during the Civil Constitution of the Clergy
 Refractory disease, one not responsive to common modes of treatment
 Refractory (mineral processing), metallic minerals that are difficult to liberate in traditional processes (e.g. refractory gold ores).
 Refractory period (disambiguation), a period immediately following a stimulus during which further stimulation has no effect
 Refractory period (physiology), the time after an action potential during which a membrane can not depolarize
 Refractory period (sex), a period after orgasm during which it is impossible to achieve another orgasm
 Psychological refractory period, the delay in response to the second of two closely spaced psychological stimuli
 Postictal state, the period following a series of epileptic seizures during which seizures cannot be induced